Charles Hillinger (April 1, 1926 – April 28, 2008) was an American journalist. He wrote for the Los Angeles Times from 1946 to 1992, initially as a reporter, and eventually as a feature writer and a columnist. He authored several books, including California Characters: An Array of Amazing People, a collection of his columns.

Life
Hillinger was born on April 1, 1926 in Evanston, Illinois. He graduated from the University of California, Los Angeles (UCLA), where he earned a bachelor's degree in Political Science.

Hillinger joined Los Angeles Times in 1946. He initially worked in its editorial library, and he later became a reporter. He penned a column called Charles Hillinger's California from 1985 to 1991. During that time, he wrote feature articles about individuals all over the country, including Puerto Rico and the Virgin Islands. He retired in 1992.

Hillinger was honored with an NAACP Image Award in 1980. He authored three books and edited a fourth book about the Bel Air Country Club. His 2000 book, California Characters: An Array of Amazing People, was a collection of some of his columns. For Jonathan Kirsch, "Hillinger's book is never a freak show, and more often than not the profiles are little morality plays."

With his wife Arliene, Hillinger had a son, Brad, and a daughter, Tori Lindman. He died on April 28, 2008 in Rancho Palos Verdes, California. His funeral was held at the Rolling Hills Covenant Church in Rolling Hills Estates, California.

Works

References

1926 births
2008 deaths
University of California, Los Angeles alumni
20th-century American journalists
American male journalists
American columnists
Los Angeles Times people
NAACP Image Awards